George Anthony Hylton (born 27 April 1957) is a Jamaican politician who served as Minister of Foreign Affairs from 2006 to 2007.

Career
Hylton was elected member of parliament with the People's National Party for Saint Andrew Western in 1993. He has held other portfolios including Minister of Foreign Trade as well as Mining and Energy.

In 2014, he faced charges of breaching the Parliamentary Integrity of Members Act. As of 2016, he is the opposition spokesperson on industry, investment and commerce.

Personal life
He was educated at Georgetown University Law center and Morgan State University. Hylton's niece is gymnast and Olympics competitor Toni-Ann Williams.

External links
 Official party biography
 http://www.un.org/webcast/ga/61/pdfs/jamaica-e.pdf

References

1957 births
Living people
Members of the House of Representatives of Jamaica
Foreign ministers of Jamaica
Government ministers of Jamaica
People from Saint Thomas Parish, Jamaica
People's National Party (Jamaica) politicians
Georgetown University Law Center alumni
Morgan State University alumni
Members of the 10th Parliament of Jamaica
Members of the 11th Parliament of Jamaica
Members of the 12th Parliament of Jamaica
Members of the 13th Parliament of Jamaica
Members of the 14th Parliament of Jamaica